John S. Davies (1926–2010) was a former Republican member of the Pennsylvania House of Representatives.
 He was the son of John and Caroline (née Boas) Davies.

References

Republican Party members of the Pennsylvania House of Representatives
2010 deaths
1926 births